Fog Over Frisco is a 1934 American Pre-Code drama film directed by William Dieterle. The screenplay by Robert N. Lee and Eugene Solow was based on the short story The Five Fragments by George Dyer.

Plot
Arlene Bradford (Bette Davis) is a spoiled, bored, wealthy socialite who finances her extravagant lifestyle by exploiting her fiancé Spencer Carlton's (Lyle Talbot) access to her stepfather's brokerage firm and using her connection to steal security bonds for crime boss Jake Bello (Irving Pichel).

When Arlene disappears, her step-sister Val (Margaret Lindsay) steps in to discover what happened to her with the help of society reporter Tony Sterling (Donald Woods) and photojournalist Izzy Wright (Hugh Herbert).

Principal cast
Bette Davis as Arlene Bradford
Donald Woods as Tony Sterling
Margaret Lindsay as Val Bradford
Hugh Herbert as Izzy Wright
Lyle Talbot as Spencer Carlton
Irving Pichel as Jake Bello
Alan Hale as Chief C.B. O'Malley
William Demarest as Spike Smith
Arthur Byron as Everett Bradford
George Chandler as Taxi Driver

Background
Bette Davis, anxious to portray the slatternly waitress Mildred in the RKO Radio Pictures production Of Human Bondage, accepted the relatively small role of Arlene in the hope her cooperation would convince Jack L. Warner to lend her to the rival studio for the film. Her ploy worked, and when Warner received word about her dynamic performance in Bondage, he elevated her to top billing in Frisco.

Part of the Warner Brothers release was filmed on location in San Francisco. It was remade as Spy Ship in 1942.

It was released on DVD in July 2010.

Critical reception
In his review in The New York Times, Mordaunt Hall described the film as a "ruddy thriller" and wrote "What [it] lacks in the matter of credibility, it atones for partly by its breathless pace and its abundance of action. As the story of murder and robbery passes on the screen it scarcely gives the spectator time to think who might be the ring-leader of the band of desperadoes."

Time stated "Brisk to the point of confession, Fog Over Frisco is not the best of Director William Dieterle's pictures."

Film historian William K. Everson called it "the fastest film ever made".

References

External links

1934 films
1934 crime drama films
American black-and-white films
American crime drama films
American mystery films
Films directed by William Dieterle
Films set in San Francisco
Films shot in San Francisco
First National Pictures films
Warner Bros. films
1930s English-language films
1930s American films